The Venerable John Spry, BD (Exeter 1690 – West Hendred 1763) of Lincoln College, Oxford was Archdeacon of Berkshire from his collation on 2 January 1747 until his death on 21 October 1763.

References

1690 births
Clergy from Exeter
Alumni of Lincoln College, Oxford
Archdeacons of Berkshire
1763 deaths